Auldgirth is a village on the A76 road in Dumfries and Galloway, Scotland. Auldgirth village features 'The Auldgirth Inn' and the former Auldgirth Primary School, which closed in 2000. Originally inhabitants of Auldgirth located to the scheme, situated next to the A76, but in recent years this has expanded to the outlying areas due to rejuvenation programmes. The name Auldgirth is from Early Scots ald(e) girth, meaning 'old enclosure'. At one time it had a staffed railway station, situated one mile south of the village, just before the hamlet of Dalswinton. Carse Loch and the Friar's Carse country house hotel are located nearby.

See also
Dalgarnock Village, Church and Parish
Barburgh Mill, Closeburn

References

Villages in Dumfries and Galloway